Mike Cohn is one of the contributors to the  Scrum software development method. 
He is one of the founders of the Scrum Alliance.

Early life and education
Born in Anaheim, California, U.S. in 1962, Mike Cohn received his master's degree in computer science from the University of Idaho in northern Idaho. Having a research interest in Agile project management, he specializes in communicating needs and achieving Agile project goals through user stories.

Career
Cohn began his career in the early 1980s as a programmer in APL and BASIC before moving on to C++ and Java and running development groups.

Cohn is the founder of Mountain Goat Software, a process and project management consultancy and training firm. He is the author of Agile Estimating and Planning, User Stories Applied for Agile Software Development and Succeeding with Agile: Software Development using Scrum, as well as books on Java and C++ programming.  Cohn was a keynote speaker on ADAPTing to Agile for Continued Success at the Agile 2010 Presented by the Agile Alliance. In 2012, Cohn was named #1 in The Top 20 Most Influential Agile People.

Cohn is a proponent of stand-up meeting, particularly emphasizing actual standing during them. Teams are encouraged to come up with their own rules for improving these meetings, for example fining people who are late to them. A 2011 survey of tech employees from around the world found that 78% held  daily stand-up-meetings.

Publications
 Java Developer's Reference (1996)
 Database Developer's Guide With Borland C++5: (Sams Developers Guide) (1996)
 Sams Teach Yourself Visual Café 2 in 21 Days (1997)
 Web Programming With Visual J++ (1997)

References

External links

 Cohn's Homepage

Living people
Extreme programming
American bloggers
American technology writers
21st-century American non-fiction writers
1962 births